Something to Be Proud Of: The Best of 1999–2005 is the first greatest hits compilation album American by country music duo Montgomery Gentry. It was released in 2005 (see 2005 in country music). The track "She Don't Tell Me To" was newly recorded for this album, and was released as a single. Two other tracks ("Didn't I" and "Merry Christmas from the Family") had previously charted, but not included on any of Montgomery Gentry's studio albums. The former was included on the soundtrack to We Were Soldiers, and the latter was a Christmas single.

Track listing

Personnel on "She Don't Tell Me To"
 Tom Bukovac - electric guitar
 David Campbell - string arrangements
 Perry Coleman - background vocals
 Dan Dugmore - acoustic guitar
 Troy Gentry - background vocals
 Carl Gorodetzky - string contractor
 Kenny Greenberg - electric guitar
 Eddie Montomery - lead vocals
 Greg Morrow - drums
 The Nashville String Machine - strings
 Russ Pahl - acoustic guitar
 Michael Rhodes - bass guitar
 Reese Wynans - Hammond organ

Chart performance

Weekly charts

Year-end charts

Singles

References

Montgomery Gentry albums
2005 greatest hits albums
Columbia Records compilation albums